The Dublin–Galway rivalry is a Gaelic football rivalry between Irish county teams Dublin and Galway, who first played each other in 1902. Dublin's home ground is Parnell Park and Galway's home ground is Pearse Stadium, however, all of their championship meetings have been held at neutral venues, usually Croke Park.

With Galway having the second highest number of Connacht titles and Dublin the standard bearers in Leinster, they have both enjoyed success in the All-Ireland level. Dublin and Galway have the second and third highest number of All-Ireland titles to their names respectively.

The teams have faced each other in the final on multiple occasions, with their first ever meeting coming in the 1922 final. They next met in the semi-final of the 1933 Championship, with Galway emerging victorious in Mullingar's Cusack Park. The following year's final saw the two meet again, with Galway coming out on top. The two sides next met in further finals over the following decades, facing off in 1942, 1963 and 1974 with Dublin victorious on each occasion.

The rivalry reached its nadir in the 1983 final, also known as the "Game of Shame" which was infamous for its levels of thuggery, seeing four red cards, as Dublin won by two points. The game has been described as "sour and violent" with a "poisonous atmosphere" in the crowd. They did not meet in the Championship again for 35 years, and when the teams next faced each other in the All-Ireland semi-final in 2018, Dublin emerged victorious before marching on to secure their fourth All-Ireland title in a row.

Senior results

Legend

Championship

References

Galway
Galway county football team rivalries